Just a Moment may refer to:

 "Just a Moment" (song), a song by Nas
 Just a Moment (Ling Tosite Sigure album), 2009
 Just a Moment, an album by Enric Sifa, 2007